WXCY may refer to:

 WXCY (AM), a radio station (1510 AM) licensed to serve Salem, New Jersey, United States
 WXCY-FM, a radio station (103.7 FM) licensed to serve Havre de Grace, Maryland, United States